The 11th Infantry Division "Brennero" was a infantry division of the Royal Italian Army during World War II. The Brennero was classified as a mountain infantry division, which meant that the division's artillery was moved by pack mules instead of the horse-drawn carriages of line infantry divisions. Italy's real mountain warfare divisions were the six alpine divisions manned by Alpini mountain troops. The Brennero was named for the Brenner Pass between Italy and Austria. The division was based in the western half of South Tyrol with the division's headquarter in Bolzano.

History

World War I 
The division's lineage begins with the Brigade "Avellino" established during World War I in Camposampiero on 26 May 1916. The brigade consisted of the 231st Infantry Regiment and 232nd Infantry Regiments. The brigade fought on the Italian front and for their conduct the brigade's two infantry regiments were awarded Italy's highest military honor, the Gold Medal of Military Valour. After the war regiments raised during the war were dissolved, with the exception of those, who had been awarded a Gold Medal of Military Valour.

On 15 October 1926 the brigade assumed the name of XI Infantry Brigade and received the 18th Infantry Regiment "Acqui" from the disbanded Brigade "Acqui". The brigade was the infantry component of the 11th Territorial Division of Bolzano, which also included the 9th Artillery Regiment. In 1934 the division changed its name to 11th Infantry Division "Brennero". On 15 December 1938 in preparation for the activation of the 33rd Infantry Division "Acqui" the 18th Infantry Regiment "Acqui" in Brixen and the 231st Infantry Regiment "Avellino" in Meran switched names and personnel. In August 1939 the division ceded the 18th Infantry Regiment "Acqui" to the newly activated 33rd Infantry Division "Acqui" in Meran. At the same time the XI Infantry Brigade was dissolved and the two remaining infantry regiments came under direct command of the division, with both regiments being renamed "Brennero". The 9th Artillery Regiment was also given the division's name.

World War II

Invasion of France 
On 4 January 1940, the Brennero division was transferred to Pianezza and San Maurizio Canavese region. On 10 June 1940 it was at the border with France as reserve unit of I Army Corps. Some the division's units participated in the invasion of France and entered the front on 19 June 1940 at Mont Cenis. Repeated attacks on the mountain pass of Mont Cenis were not successful until 22 June 1940. The French defence was broken on 24 June 1940, with the Brennero's troops capturing Lanslevillard and Lanslebourg-Mont-Cenis. The total loss of life for Brennero was 18 men killed and 74 wounded, with half of the deaths attributed to exposure to the elements.

Greco-Italian War 
During the Greco-Italian War the Brennero was sent as reinforcement to Albania arriving on 24 December 1940 in Vlorë. The division was part of to XXV Army Corps. The division assembled in Tepelenë by 8 January 1941, with its first units entering the front already on 31 December in Kurvelesh on 31 December 1940. On 10 January 1941, the Brennero was used to reinforce the remnants of the 37th Infantry Division "Modena" near Salari. On 9–12 February 1941 Brennero helped to defeat a Greek attack on Tepelenë, with about two-thirds of the division becoming casualties in the fierce fighting. From 7–23 April 1941, the Brennero attacked in the area of Kurvelesh and broke through Greek lines after 4 days of fighting.

Greece 
After the war had ended the division moved to Greece, where it was assigned to the III Army Corps and tasked with counter-insurgency and police duties in Athens. The division's 231st Infantry Regiment "Brennero" remained in Albania and was assigned to the 41st Infantry Division "Firenze" for anti-partisan duties. In early 1942 the newly raised 331st Infantry Regiment "Brennero" arrived as replacement for the 231st "Brennero". However on 24 October 1942 the 331st "Brennero" was transferred to the 50th Infantry Division "Regina" and moved to Rhodes.

Albania 
In February 1943 the division moved to Durrës in Albania to begin its conversion to motorized division. While in Albania the division was subordinated to IV Army Corps. After the Armistice of Cassibile was announced on 8 September 1943 the division dissolved chaotically: some troops and the division's commander joined the Germans, while other troops abandoned their heavy equipment and embarked on ships for allied-controlled southern Italy. The I Battalion/ 231st Infantry Regiment "Brennero" joined the 41st Infantry Division "Firenze", which fought with Albanian partisans against German forces, while the III Battalion/ 231st Infantry Regiment "Brennero" in Sarandë sailed to Korfu, where its men were taken prisoner by the Germans.

Organization

11th Infantry Division "Brennero" 
  11th Infantry Division "Brennero", in Bolzano
 231st Infantry Regiment "Brennero", in Brixen
 Command Company
 3x Fusilier battalions
 Support Weapons Company (65/17 infantry support guns)
 Mortar Company (81mm Mod. 35 mortars)
 232nd Infantry Regiment "Brennero", in Bolzano
 Command Company
 3x Fusilier battalions
 Support Weapons Company (65/17 infantry support guns)
 Mortar Company (81mm Mod. 35 mortars)
 331st Infantry Regiment "Brennero" (raised on 1 November 1941, transferred to Rhodes and joined the 50th Infantry Division "Regina" on 24 October 1942, dissolved on 11 September 1943)
 Command Company
 3x Fusilier battalions
 Support Weapons Company (47/32 anti-tank guns)
 Mortar Company (81mm Mod. 35 mortars)
 9th Artillery Regiment "Brennero", in Brixen
 Command Unit
 I Group (100/17 howitzers)
 II Group (75/27 field guns)
 III Group (75/27 field guns)
 205th Anti-aircraft Battery (20/65 Mod. 35 anti-aircraft guns)
 211th Anti-aircraft Battery (20/65 Mod. 35 anti-aircraft guns)
 Ammunition and Supply Unit
 XI Mortar Battalion (81mm Mod. 35 mortars; transferred to the LI Special Brigade "Lecce")
 11th Anti-tank Company (47/32 anti-tank guns)
 11th Telegraph and Radio Operators Company
 32nd Engineer Company
 22nd Medical Section
 4x Field hospitals
 1x Surgical Unit
 11th Truck Section
 139th Transport Section
 19th Supply Section
 28th Bakers Section
 28th Carabinieri Section
 29th Carabinieri Section
 61st Field Post Office

Attached during the invasion of France in 1940:
 XL CC.NN. Battalion

Attached from 14 November 1940 until April 1942:
 45th CC.NN. Legion "Alto Adige"
 Command Company
 XXV CC.NN. Battalion
 XLV CC.NN. Battalion
 45th CC.NN. Machine Gun Company

The XXV CC.NN. Battalion remained with the division even after the 45th CC.NN. Legion "Alto Adige" had returned to Italy.

11th Motorized Division "Brennero" 
Below follows the organization of the 11th Motorized Division "Brennero":

  11th Motorized Division "Brennero"
 231st Motorized Infantry Regiment "Brennero"
 Command Company
 3x Fusilier battalions
 Support Weapons Company (65/17 infantry support guns)
 Mortar Company (81mm Mod. 35 mortars)
 232nd Motorized Infantry Regiment "Brennero"
 Command Company
 3x Fusilier battalions
 Support Weapons Company (65/17 infantry support guns)
 Mortar Company (81mm Mod. 35 mortars)
 9th Motorized Artillery Regiment "Brennero"
 Command Unit
 I Group (75/27 field guns)
 II Group (75/32 field guns)
 III Group (75/32 field guns)
 XLVII Anti-aircraft Group (75/46 C.A. Mod. 34 anti-aircraft guns)
 DLVIII Self-propelled Group (75/18 M41 self-propelled guns)
 Ammunition and Supply Unit
 CXXXII Self-propelled Anti-tank Group (47/32 L40 self-propelled guns)
 CXI Mixed Engineer Battalion
 22nd Medical Section
 4x Field hospitals
 1x Surgical Unit
 19th Supply Section
 28th Bakers Section
 28th Carabinieri Section
 61st Field Post Office

Attached units in 1943:
 XXV CC.NN. Battalion
 XXVI Machine Gun Battalion
 CDLXXIX Coastal Infantry Battalion

Commanding officers 
The division's commanding officers were:

 Generale di Divisione Emilio Bancale (1 April 1938 – 1 September 1939)
 Generale di Divisione Arnaldo Forgiero (1 September 1939 - 20 October 1940)
 Generale di Divisione Paolo Berardi (21 October 1940 - 30 September 1941)
 Generale di Divisione Licurgo Zannini (1 October 1941 - 10 February 1942)
 Generale di Divisione Mario Marghinotti (11 February 1942 - 19 December 1942)
 Generale di Brigata Aldo Princivalle (20 December 1942 - 8 September 1943)

Notes

References 

 
 

Infantry divisions of Italy in World War II
Italian military units and formations of the Greco-Italian War
Military units and formations disestablished in 1943
Military units and formations established in 1939